Uddhav (also spelled Uddhava, Udhav) is a Hindu male name found in India. It may refer to:

People
 Uddhava, a character from the Bhagavata Purana text of Hinduism
 Uddhav Bhandari (c. 1967–2007), Nepali asylum seeker who self-immolated in the UK
 Udhavrao Patil (1920–1984), Indian politician
 Uddhav Thackeray (born 1960), Indian politician

Other
 Uddhav Thackeray ministry (2019–2022), a ruling coalition in Maharashtra, India
 Uddhav Sampraday, a Hindu Vaishnava sect that evolved into the Swaminarayan Sampradaya

See also
 Uddhava Gita, a standalone work consisting Krishna's final discourse to Uddhava
 Odhav, neighbourhood in Ahmedabad, Gujarat, India
 Odhava, village in Gujarat, India
 Odhavram, Indian religious teacher and Gandhist
 Odhavaji Raghavji Patel, Indian businessman